Rahil Izhar Ahmed (born 3 January 1994) is a Dutch cricketer. He made his List A cricket debut in the 2015 ICC World Cricket League Division Two tournament for the Netherlands against Kenya on 21 January 2015. He made his Twenty20 International debut against Nepal on 2 July 2015. He made his first class debut against Scotland in the 2015–17 ICC Intercontinental Cup on 9 September 2015.

References

External links
 

1994 births
Living people
Dutch cricketers
Netherlands Twenty20 International cricketers
Sportspeople from Amsterdam